Maag is a surname. Notable persons with that name include:

 Bruno Maag (born 1962), Swiss type designer 
 Dan Maag (born 1975), German film producer
 Karin Maag (born 1962), German politician
 Peter Maag (1919–2001), Swiss conductor 
 Ron Maag (born 1945), American politician

See also
AnnaSofia Mååg (born 1968), Swedish ice artist
 MAAG